Wendy Testaburger is a fictional character in the adult animated television series South Park. She is the primary female character in the show, and is best known for her on-again, off-again relationship with her boyfriend Stan Marsh. Being more intelligent and mature than most children her age, Wendy finds expression in her activism and feminism. Wendy debuted as a nameless background character in Trey Parker and Matt Stone's 1995 college short film The Spirit of Christmas, and made her first appearance on television when South Park initially premiered on Comedy Central on August 13, 1997, with the episode "Cartman Gets an Anal Probe". She is currently voiced by April Stewart, but had previously been voiced by three different voice actors in the show's run: Mary Kay Bergman, Eliza Schneider, and Mona Marshall.

Biography 
In South Parks first 19 seasons, Wendy attends South Park Elementary as a third-then fourth-grade student of Mr. Garrison's class – a position of his which is then replaced by Ms. Nelson after Garrison becomes the 45th President of the United States starting with season 19 onward. She resides in South Park, Colorado as the only child of Mr. and Mrs. Testaburger. In the episode "Tom's Rhinoplasty", it is revealed by Principal Victoria that her grandmother died during the events of the episode, in reference to the scene in the 1986 John Hughes film Ferris Bueller's Day Off, where the nurse informs Sloane of the same news. During the show's first 58 episodes – "Cartman Gets an Anal Probe" to the season 4 episode "Fourth Grade" – Wendy is a third-grade student in Mr. Garrison's class. Starting with the aforementioned "Fourth Grade", Wendy's grade, along with all the other major child characters', transfers to the fourth and remains as such due to the floating timeline of the series. 

In the future, beginning with the film South Park: Post Covid, Wendy now had a husband named Darwin. At the end of the film South Park: Post Covid: The Return of Covid, she reunites with Stan, hinting at a future relationship.

Character

Creation and design
In the 1995 short The Spirit of Christmas and South Parks debut episode, "Cartman Gets an Anal Probe", Wendy is composed of construction paper and animated through the use of stop motion. Starting with "Weight Gain 4000" onwards, she is animated via computer software, though her appearance is portrayed to give the impression that the show still uses its construction paper technique. In tradition of the show's animation style, Wendy is composed of simple geometrical shapes and colors, and she is not offered the same free range associated with most hand-drawn characters; her character is typically shown from one angle and animated in an intentionally crude fashion.

Wendy is usually depicted wearing winter attire consisting of a light purple jacket, yellow pants, navy blue gloves/mittens, and a pink beret. In the rare instances Wendy is seen without her hat, she has long black hair with uneven bangs. While Mary Kay Bergman, Eliza Schneider and Mona Marshall originally voiced Wendy without any computer manipulation, April Stewart now speaks within her normal vocal range while adding a childlike inflection. The recorded audio is then edited with Pro Tools, and the pitch is altered to make the voice sound more like that of a fourth grader.

Development
Fellow co-creator Stone has stated that Wendy's name is based on that of Wendy Westaburger, the wife of a friend from his childhood.

Wendy first appeared in the 1995 sequel to Stone and Parker's 1992 film The Spirit of Christmas, Jesus vs. Santa, which was developed after Fox executive Brian Graden paid Stone and Parker $1,000 to make another animated short as a video Christmas card that he could send to friends. In turn, the duo created the aforementioned sequel.

Personality and traits
Wendy is portrayed as more level-headed and mature than her peers, often getting good grades and protesting world issues. For example, in the episode "Breast Cancer Show Ever" she writes an essay in regards to breast cancer and expresses her condolences to the disease's patients. However, Wendy is also shown to be rather narcissistic, especially when confronted with a female that she perceives to be higher than her in the social hierarchy. Examples of this can be found in the episode "Bebe's Boobs Destroy Society", in which the attention Bebe is receiving from boys prompts Wendy to get breast enhancement surgery, as well as in the episode "Tom's Rhinoplasty", in which Wendy pays to have an attractive new teacher killed.

Due to her liberal views, Wendy frequently comes into conflict with Eric Cartman. For instance, in the aforementioned "Breast Cancer Show Ever", Wendy engages in a violent fight with Cartman due to his mockery of the subject of breast cancer.

Wendy tends to be outcast by her girlfriends for not giving into peer pressure: In "Stupid Spoiled Whore Video Playset", she refuses to participate in the trend of emulating notorious celebrity Paris Hilton, deeming her a bad influence towards the female youth, which leads to betrayal by her female peers.

One of Wendy's most defining traits over the course of the series is her on-again, off-again relationship with Stan Marsh. Despite the problematic elements of their relationship, Stan is still shown to have feelings for Wendy whenever the two break up: in the episode "Raisins", he is left devastated for weeks after she dumps him in favor of Tolkien Black and joins an alliance of goth children as a result. Trey Parker has stated that Wendy's relationship with Stan was intended to represent a stereotypical elementary school relationship, where the two children "don't really know each other" but still call themselves boyfriend and girlfriend.

Reception
Time featured Wendy on a list entitled "The Top 26 Best Female TV Cartoon Characters". IGN ranked the character #22 on "The Top 25 Best South Park Characters" and described her as the "Courtney Love of the series" stating that "if she wasn't the girlfriend of someone important, we probably wouldn't have initially paid any attention to her at all." PasteMagazine ranked her at #12 on a list entitled "The Top 20 Best South Park Characters" and praised her for her oppositions of the politically incorrect portrayal of society. TVOvermind ranked her #8 on a list entitled "Top 10 Best South Park" characters, praising her utilization of realism and political voice-of-reason, also criticizing her lack of prominence in the more recent seasons of South Park.

Appearances in other media

Wendy appears in many South Park-related media and merchandise, such as its 1999 musical comedy adaptation South Park: Bigger, Longer & Uncut and its video games South Park the Video Game, South Park Rally, South Park: The Stick of Truth, and played a significant role in South Park: The Fractured but Whole.

Wendy did briefly appear in the secret levels in the game Pizza Tower. She wasn't in the game for long as she got removed immediately in a day 1 patch.

References

Animated human characters
American female characters in television
Child characters in animated television series
Child characters in film
Comedy film characters
Female characters in animated series
Female characters in film
Fictional characters based on real people
Fictional characters from Colorado
Fictional elementary school students
Fictional feminists and women's rights activists
Television characters introduced in 1997
South Park characters
Animated characters introduced in 1997